The Malolos Congress (also known as the Revolutionary Congress), formally known as the National Assembly, was the legislative body of the Revolutionary Government of the Philippines. Members were chosen in the elections held from June 23 to September 10, 1898. The assembly consisted of elected delegates chosen by balloting in provincial assemblies and appointed delegates chosen by the president to represent regions under unstable military and civilian conditions. The Revolutionary Congress was opened on September 15, 1898 at Barasoain Church in Malolos, Bulacan. President Emilio Aguinaldo presided over the opening session of the assembly.

After the promulgation of the Malolos Constitution on January 22, 1899, replaced the revolutionary government with the  Philippine Republic, the Malolos Congress became the legislative branch of that government, designated in the constitution as the Assembly of Representatives.

Sessions 
 Regular session: September 15, 1898 – November 13, 1899
 Special session: February 4, 1899

Leadership 
President of the Revolutionary Congress
Pedro Paterno
Vice President/Deputy  
Benito Legarda
Secretary
Gregorio S. Araneta and Pablo Ocampo

Members 

In 2006, it was asserted by the president of the Bulacan Historical Society, engineer Marcial Aniag, that among the 85 delegates who convened in Malolos there were 43 lawyers, 17 doctors, five pharmacists, three educators, seven businessmen, four painters, three military men, a priest, and four farmers.  Five of the 85 delegates did not have a college degree.

Ratification of the declaration of independence 
One of the first acts of the Revolutionary Congress was the ratification on September 29, 1898 of the Philippine Declaration of Independence against Spain which had been proclaimed on June 12, 1898.

Malolos Constitution 
Mabini had planned for the Revolutionary Congress to act only as an advisory body to the president and submitted a draft of Constitutional Program of the Philippine Republic while Paterno submitted a constitutional draft  based on the Spanish Constitution of 1869. The Congress, however, began work to draft a constitution. The resulting document, the Malolos Constitution, was promulgated on January 21, 1899. Its proclamation resulted in the creation of the Philippine Republic, which replaced the Revolutionary Government.

Notes

References

External links 
 

Malolos Congress